The Methylophilales-1 RNA motif is a conserved RNA structure that was discovered by bioinformatics.
Energetically stable tetraloops often occur in this motif.
The Methylophilales-1 motif is found in Methylophilales and metagenomic sequences derived from lake sediment.

Methylophilales-1 RNAs likely function in trans as small RNAs.

References

Non-coding RNA